Charaxes (Polyura) clitarchus is a butterfly in the family Nymphalidae. It was described by William Chapman Hewitson in 1874. It is endemic to New Caledonia and the Loyalty Islands.

References

External links
Polyura Billberg, 1820 at Markku Savela's Lepidoptera and Some Other Life Forms

Polyura
Butterflies described in 1874
Butterflies of Oceania
Taxa named by William Chapman Hewitson